Stefan Ritt is a German physicist and head of the muon physics group at the Paul Scherrer Institute, Aargau, Switzerland. He is member of the MEG experiment and co-spokesperson of the Mu3e experiment. He is best known for the development of the DRS4 Switched Capacitor Array Chip, as primary author of the MIDAS Data Acquisition System and as author of the ELOG Electronic Logbook. He is co-author of two patents related to Switched Capacitor Array Circuits and their calibration.

In addition Ritt is an active member of the IEEE Nuclear and Plasma Sciences Society, where he is a Distinguished Lecturer and was Society President 2017-2018.

He was named Fellow of the Institute of Electrical and Electronics Engineers (IEEE) in 2016 for the development of the Domino Ring Sampler series of chips and was awarded the IEEE Emilio Gatti Radiation Instrumentation Technical Achievement Award in 2020 for contributions to the development and democratization of ultra-high-speed digitizers.

References 

Fellow Members of the IEEE
1964 births
Living people